This page lists the albums that reached number-one on the overall Top R&B/Hip-Hop Albums chart, the R&B Albums chart, and the Rap Albums chart in 2023. The R&B Albums and Rap Albums charts partly serve as respective distillations for R&B and rap-specific titles of the overall R&B/Hip-Hop Albums chart.

List of number ones

See also
2023 in American music
2023 in hip hop music
List of Billboard 200 number-one albums of 2023
List of number-one R&B/hip-hop songs of 2023 (U.S.)

References

2023
2023
United States RandB Hip Hop Albums